

This is a list of video games for the Xbox One video game console that have sold or shipped at least one million copies worldwide.

List

Notes

References

 
Xbox One